RK Miesnieki is a Latvian rugby club based in Riga.

External links
RK Miesnieki

Latvian rugby union teams
Sport in Riga